IIU may refer to:

Independent Investigation Unit, in Manitoba, Canada
Indus International University, in Haroli, Himachal Pradesh, India
INTI International University, in Malaysia
Isles International University, formerly Irish International University
International Investment & Underwriting, private equity firm founded by Dermot Desmond